Donald T. Nicolaisen was the chief accountant for the U.S. Securities and Exchange Commission between 2003 and 2005.

External links
  SEC Auditor, Fannie Critic Resigning
 Reflections on the Career of Donald T. Nicolaisen

Directors of Morgan Stanley
Members of the U.S. Securities and Exchange Commission
Living people
Year of birth missing (living people)
Place of birth missing (living people)